Donald Duane Banks (born 1941) is a former American college baseball coach and catcher. He played professional baseball in 1964, before returning to college. He was the head baseball coach at the University of Iowa from 1970 to 1997.

Head coaching record

References

External links

1941 births
Living people
Gulf Coast Braves players
Northern Colorado Bears baseball players
Colorado Mesa Mavericks baseball players
Northern Colorado Bears men's basketball players
Northern Colorado Bears baseball coaches
Parsons Wildcats baseball coaches
Colorado State Rams baseball coaches
Iowa Hawkeyes baseball coaches
People from Grand Junction, Colorado